Necip Kurdo Sirka Baksi, (born 5 June 1965) is a Swedish social commentator and author. Baksi was born in Batman, Turkey, of Kurdish descent. He is the brother of Nalin Pekgul and the nephew of Mahmud Baksi. He came to Sweden in 1980 along with his parents and four siblings.

Kurdo Baksi founded the anti-racist magazine Svartvitt in 1987. During a five-year period between 1998 and 2002, he helped Svartvitt and the anti-racist magazine Expo to survive by a co-operation between the magazines which merged and became Svartvitt med Expo. Svarvitt was cancelled in 2002/2003 and the magazine changed name to Expo again.

In 1992, he organized a big anti-racist manifestation in Sweden under the name "Utan invandrare stannar Sverige" (meaning "Without immigrants Sweden stops"), with the purpose of marking immigrants' importance in the Swedish society. Baksi is also an active debater, and lecturer in questions about immigration, racism, and opinion-making for the creation of a Kurdish state.

Baksi is a used commentator and wrote several texts about topics such as Turkey, the Gray Wolves, Armenian Genocide and armed conflict on Nagorno-Karabach.

References

Living people
1965 births
Swedish people of Kurdish descent
21st-century Swedish writers
20th-century Swedish writers
Swedish political writers
20th-century Swedish male writers